Johannes (Johann) Flüggé (22 June 1775 – 28 June 1816) was a German botanist and physician who was a native of Hamburg.

He studied medicine and natural history at the Universities of Jena, Vienna and Göttingen, and in 1800 received his doctorate at the University of Erlangen. Afterwards he undertook botanical excursions throughout Germany and France.

In 1810 Flüggé established the first botanical garden in Hamburg. He is remembered for his research of grasses in the genus Paspalum. The plant genus Flueggea from the family Phyllanthaceae is named in his honor. In 1810 he published the monograph Graminum Monographiae. Pars 1, Paspalum, Reimaria.

References 
 Die botanischen Institute der Freien und Hansestadt (biography in German)

19th-century German botanists
Scientists from Hamburg
1775 births
1816 deaths